Christopher Kimball is an American  editor, publisher, and radio and TV personality. He is notable as one of the founders of America's Test Kitchen and Cook's Country and as the creator of Christopher Kimball's Milk Street.

Early life and education 
Kimball was born and raised in Westchester County, New York, the son of Mary Alice White and Edward Norris Kimball. The family had a cabin in southwestern Vermont.

He graduated from Phillips Exeter Academy and then Columbia University (1973) with a degree in Primitive Art.

Career

Early career 
After graduating from Columbia, Kimball worked with his stepbrother in a publishing company. Soon after, he worked for The Center for Direct Marketing in Westport, Connecticut and also started taking cooking courses. In 1980, after securing $100,000 in angel investments from friends and family, he started Cook’s Magazine out of an office in Weston, Connecticut. He sold the magazine to the Bonnier Group in 1989.

America's Test Kitchen
Kimball was a co-founder, as well as editor and publisher of America's Test Kitchen, which produces television and radio shows, and publishes magazines, including Cook's Illustrated, which Kimball launched in 1993. It also publishes Cook's Country magazine, which was launched in 2004. The company's revenue comes from its readers, rather than advertisers, which differentiates it from the competitors.

Its cookbook publisher division is Two Pigs Farm. Boston Common Press, a private partnership between Kimball, Eliot Wadsworth II, and George P. Denny III, owned Kimball's publishing activities. Kimball also hosted the syndicated public television cooking shows America's Test Kitchen and Cook's Country from America's Test Kitchen.

On November 16, 2015, a news release from Boston Common Press, parent company of Cooks Country/Cooks Illustrated/America's Test Kitchen, announced Kimball's departure. The 2016 TV programs had already been filmed and Kimball appeared as host, but his direct participation in the company ended immediately.

Christopher Kimball's Milk Street

In 2016, Kimball created Christopher Kimball's Milk Street, located on Milk Street in Boston, Massachusetts. On October 31, 2016, Boston Common Press (the parent company of America's Test Kitchen and Cook's Illustrated) filed a lawsuit against Kimball in Suffolk Superior Court, claiming that Kimball "literally and conceptually ripped off" his former employer. In the lawsuit, Boston Common Press claims Kimball built his new venture while still on their payroll, using company resources in the form of recipes and databases to help shape Milk Street Kitchen into a direct competitor. The lawsuit was settled in August 2019. As part of the settlement, Kimball sold his remaining ATK stock back to the company.

He was further sued by his ex-wife Adrienne who alleged his departure from Cook's Illustrated devalued the company and affected his payments to her.

Other 

He is the author of The Cook's Bible, The Yellow Farmhouse Cookbook, Dear Charlie, The Dessert Bible, and Fannie's Last Supper, and is a columnist for the New York Daily News and the Boston-based Tab Communications.

His other television appearances include This Old House and the morning shows Weekend Today and The Early Show.

He has been a regular contributor on National Public Radio. On January 8, 2011, Kimball began hosting WGBH-FM's America's Test Kitchen Radio distributed by PRX. In 2015, when he left the America's Test Kitchen TV shows, his association with the radio program also ended. He began hosting a new weekly radio cooking show in 2016, Milk Street Radio, also heard on WGBH-FM in Boston, airing Sundays at 3 p.m., and syndicated to other US public radio stations.

Personal life 
He has been married three times. He had a son and three daughters with his second wife, Adrienne. They divorced in December 2012.

On June 30, 2013, Kimball married Melissa Lee Baldino, executive producer of the America's Test Kitchen television show. She is now co-founder of Christopher Kimball's Milk Street. Their son, Oliver Kimball, was born on May 4, 2017. A daughter, Rike, was born in 2019.

References

Sources

Further reading 
Toasting Fannie Farmer With An Epic Victorian Feast, NPR, October 14, 2010
 Halberstadt, Alex, "The secret to Christopher Kimball's success", The New York Times Magazine, October 14, 2012.

External links

Christopher Kimball's Milk Street
 

Living people
American magazine founders
American male chefs
American radio personalities
American television chefs
Chefs from New York (state)
Columbia College (New York) alumni
PBS people
People from Rye, New York
People from Westchester County, New York
Phillips Exeter Academy alumni
American gastronomes
1951 births